MSV-Arena, currently known for sponsorship purposes as the Schauinsland-Reisen-Arena, is a football stadium in Duisburg, North Rhine-Westphalia, Germany, built in 2004. The stadium is the home of MSV Duisburg and holds 31,500 people. It was built on the site of the old Wedaustadion. The stadium was the venue of the 2005 World Games.

References

Football venues in Germany
Buildings and structures in Duisburg
MSV Duisburg
Rugby union stadiums in Germany
Rhein Fire (ELF)
Sports venues in North Rhine-Westphalia
2004 establishments in Germany
Sports venues completed in 2004
American football venues in Germany
European League of Football venues